Mount Langya is a mountain located south west of Chuzhou City, Anhui Province, People's Republic of China. A National Forest Park, National Scenic Area and 4A Tourism Attraction, the mountain is one of Anhui's five biggest scenic attractions. Along with mountain scenery, rivers and forest, the area also contains the Zuiweng Pavilion, named after the Northern Song Dynasty poet Ouyang Xiu (1007–1072 CE)).

During the early Eastern Jin Dynasty (317–420 CE), Emperor Yuan of Jin, gave the area to King Langya, from which it takes its name.

Attractions
The primary attractions in the area are:
 Gumei Pavilion
 Zuiweng Pavilion 
 Rang Spring
 Xixin Pavilion
 Langya Old Road
 Lake Shenxiu
 Langya Temple, 
 Nantianmen
 Huifeng Pavilion 
 Tongle Garden
 Fengle Pavilion

See also
Mount Langya (Hebei)
Langya henipavirus

References

External links
 (In Chinese) Official Website

Mountains of Anhui
Tourist attractions in Anhui